IDP Education Limited is an international education organisation offering student placement in Australia, New Zealand, USA, UK, Republic of Ireland and Canada. 

IDP has more than 100 offices in 31 countries and 550 counsellors. IDP Australia partners with University of Cambridge ESOL Examinations and the British Council for IELTS tests. 

More than 3 million IELTS tests were undertaken around the world in 2018 and over 10,000 organisations rely on IELTS including governments for migration assessment, universities for admissions and employers and professional registration bodies. 

IELTS Australia Pvt Ltd manages a network of more than 200 IELTS test centres in over 35 countries. There are over 1000 IELTS test centres globally. Anyone interested in passing the IELTS as part of a visa application to study or work abroad should make sure s/he refers to the Government website (Immigration pages) of their proposed destination country. Each destination country specifies approved test centres for Visa IELTS and often state the grade required by the visa authority.

History
IDP was established in 1969 as Australian Asian Universities' Cooperation Scheme (AAUCS)  universities in South-East Asia.  AAUCS changed its name to the International Development Program (IDP) of Australian Universities and Colleges and schools.

In 2006, SEEK acquired 50% shares of IDP from the Australian universities consortium Education Australia . Education Australia was formerly known as IDP Education Australia Limited.

In 2015, IDP became a list company which SEEK sold its 50% shares to the general public.

In January 2017 IDP acquired UK Educational listings company Hotcourses for £30 million. Hotcourses was co-founded by British politician and former Foreign Secretary Jeremy Hunt.

In April 2020, IDP issued new shares that raised AU$175 million. In June, Education Australia, the holding company for the 38 universities of Australia (note: there are more than 38 universities in Australia, some of them are not the shareholders of Education Australia), sold 5% shares to the public. In March 2021, Education Australia announced to sell a further 15% shares to the public and announced that the remaining 25% shares of IDP would be distributed to the 38 universities.

References

External links
 

University and college admissions
Education companies of Australia
Companies listed on the Australian Securities Exchange